Rachel Margot Breton (born August 4, 1990) is an American soccer striker and defender. She previously played for Sky Blue FC and New Jersey Wildcats.

Club career
On May 30, 2013, she was called up from the Sky Blue FC's reserve team into the first team. She made her debut on July 6, 2013, against Washington Spirit. She was described as a "terrific overall athlete who is capable of playing anywhere on the field, strong on the ball and has great quickness."

Personal life
Born in Kearny, New Jersey, Breton grew up in Manalapan Township, New Jersey.

Her father and uncle were also football players.

References

External links
 

1990 births
Living people
NJ/NY Gotham FC players
Villanova Wildcats women's soccer players
Rutgers Scarlet Knights women's soccer players
National Women's Soccer League players
American women's soccer players
New Jersey Wildcats players
People from Kearny, New Jersey
People from Manalapan Township, New Jersey
Soccer players from New Jersey
Sportspeople from Monmouth County, New Jersey
Women's association football defenders
Women's association football forwards
Amazon Grimstad players
Toppserien players
American expatriate women's soccer players
American expatriate sportspeople in Norway
Expatriate women's footballers in Norway